Marilyn Lightstone (born 28 June 1940) is a Canadian stage, film and television actress and writer.

Biography

Early life and education
Born in Montreal, Quebec, Marilyn Lightstone graduated from Baron Byng High School in 1957. She went on to attend McGill University where she received a bachelor's degree. Lightstone then attended and graduated from the National Theatre School.

Career
She starred on Canadian television as Miss Stacey in Anne of Green Gables and Road to Avonlea. She has won two Canadian Film Awards; a Genie for Best Actress in Lies My Father Told Me and a Genie for Best Supporting Actress for In Praise of Older Women.  She won an award for Best Actress at the Moscow International Film Festival for The Tin Flute.

Her stage roles include Goneril in King Lear at the Lincoln Centre in New York, Mash in Chekov's The Seagull at the Stratford Festival and Leah in The Dybbuk.  In 1976, Lightstone starred in a play produced by Moses Znaimer, Miss Margarida. She performed in the lead role in the play Tamara to audiences in New York and Los Angeles, another Znaimer production.

She has made several guest appearances on television series and rendered her voice for radio drama, voice-overs and commercials as well as providing voices for animated cartoons.

Lightstone is a painter and writer, and formerly the brand announcer for Canadian arts television network Bravo!. She has served as Associate Producer and Co-director of Spoken Art and has hosted Playwrights and Screenwriters.

She has written scripts for television series and a novel, Rogues and Vagabonds.  She has written a collection of songs, Miss Lightstone Sings and her interfaith song The Light Shines All Over the World has been released as a music video.

She hosts an evening program, Nocturne, on Classical 96, Moses Znaimer's classical music radio station in Toronto.

Personal life
Marilyn Lightstone is in a long-term relationship with Moses Znaimer, who is the current head of ZoomerMedia. They met at McGill University at the McGill Player's Club in the early 1960's.
 
She has said she is still interested in acting, even on stage, but only in what she would consider "meaningful" roles. As of 2008, she has said she is currently interested in mainly painting and photography.

Filmography

Film

Television

Writer
 Shades of Love: Little White Lies (1988)
 The Littlest Hobo (1979)

Literary works
Rogues & Vagabonds

Appearances
Marilyn Lightstone attended TFcon 2013 as a guest, where she reprised her roles as Crasher and Pathfinder (called Roswell) for a voice actor play.

References

External links
Marilyn's Personal Website
 Classical FM
 

1940 births
Living people
Canadian film actresses
Canadian voice actresses
Canadian television actresses
Canadian radio hosts
Canadian television writers
Actresses from Montreal
Writers from Montreal
Classical music radio presenters
Best Actress Genie and Canadian Screen Award winners
Best Supporting Actress Genie and Canadian Screen Award winners
Canadian women television writers
Canadian women radio hosts